Sidney (SENĆOŦEN: SET,TINES) is a town located at the northern end of the Saanich Peninsula, on Vancouver Island in the Canadian province of British Columbia. It's 1 of the 13 Greater Victoria municipalities. It has a population of approximately 11,583. The town is also the only Canadian port-of-call in the Washington State Ferries system, with ferries running from Sidney to the San Juan Islands and Anacortes. Sidney is located along Highway 17, which bisects the town from north to south. It is generally considered part of the Victoria metropolitan area.

The town west of Highway 17 (also called Patricia Bay Highway, locally abbreviated as the Pat Bay Highway) has a mixture of single-family residences and light industry. The
majority of the town is located east of Highway 17. Single-family units are also present east of the highway, but the eastern sector also has many condominium-type buildings, plus most of the service and retail outlets. The island-studded Haro Strait, part of the Salish Sea, forms Sidney's eastern boundary. There is a large boating and marine industry in the area, ranging from marinas to boatbuilders and marine suppliers.

Sidney takes its name from nearby Sidney Island.  In 1859 Captain Richards named that island for Frederick W. Sidney, who, like Richards served in the survey branch of the Royal Navy.

Demographics 

Sidney has a median age of 60.4 in 2001 as compared with the British Columbia median age of 38.4. Sidney had more than 35% of their population over the age of 65.

Ethnicity

Religion 
According to the 2021 census, religious groups in Sidney included:
Irreligion (6,150 persons or 52.2%)
Christianity (5,330 persons or 45.2%)
Judaism (55 persons or 0.5%)
Sikhism (55 persons or 0.5%)
Buddhism (35 persons or 0.3%)
Islam (25 persons or 0.2%)
Hinduism (15 persons or 0.1%)
Other (105 persons or 0.9%)

Labour force
Sidney is mainly an industrial town, with most people working in the construction, manufacturing, and warehousing fields (26%). Retail  accounts for approximately 10% of the employment. Healthcare and social assistance employs 13%. There are over 4,000 people employed in Sidney, with an unemployment rate of 6.1%. It should also be taken into consideration that some of this labour force commutes from neighbouring municipalities, such as Saanich or Victoria. The median income is $24,638. The median income for a household in the town is $63,840  Renting costs in Sidney have increased substantially over the past few years, with a Standard 2 Bedroom Suite reaching as much as $2500 a month. The average cost of a house in Sidney in March 2019 was $645,500.

Government
The Town of Sidney is a municipality governed by an elected Council. The elected Council, 2015–2018 consists of one Mayor and six Councillors. Mayor Steve Price, Councillor Erin Bremner-Mitchell, Councillor Tim Chad, Councillor Barbara Fallot, Councillor Mervyn Lougher-Goodey, Councillor Cam McLennan, and Councillor Peter Wainwright.

Education
Public schools serving Sidney residents are operated by School District 63 Saanich.  These include Sidney Elementary School, North Saanich Middle School, and Parkland Secondary School.

Sister city
On June 30, 2008, the Sidney Sister Cities Association and the town of Sidney, BC declared the twinning of Sidney and Niimi, Okayama, Japan. This was Sidney's third sister city, following Cairns, Queensland, Australia and Anacortes, Washington, United States.

Attractions
Sidney's most popular attraction is its position on the Salish Sea. Sidney-by-the-Sea is the gateway to the southern Gulf Islands National Park Reserve, and is an eco-tourist destination, with whale-watching, bird-watching, kayaking and scuba-diving. It is home to the new Shaw Ocean Discovery Centre. Shoal Harbour Migratory Bird Sanctuary is located within Sidney and the adjoining Sidney Channel Important Bird Area, an internationally recognized site important to a variety of seabirds and waterfowl.

Sidney has its own local history museum, the Sidney Museum and Archives, which features displays about the history of the surrounding Peninsula as well as temporary exhibits. As home to the Victoria International Airport Sidney also hosts the British Columbia Aviation Museum which features displays, artifacts, restored historical aircraft and a vintage aircraft restoration workshop.

During the summer, Sidney hosts a street market on Thursday evenings on the main street (Beacon). "Sidney days" is another event that occurs at the beginning of July. To celebrate, Sidney has a parade, a build-a-boat contest, a small fair and fireworks in the evening. In the winter, Sidney has a holiday parade as well as a lighted sailpast boat parade. Sidney has many dining places including Greek, Thai, Chinese, Japanese, and west-coast restaurants. With 12 bookstores, Sidney is officially one of Canada's 2 book towns, the other being St. Martins, New Brunswick. It also has almost as many coffee joints and cafes to sit and read in.

Physiography

Almost all of the land within Sidney's boundary is either flat or very gently sloping, providing a topography which is favourable for the town's elderly people. Most soils are clayey, and poorly drained in their natural state. In some parts of town, this clay is overlain by deposits of sand and gravel which are well drained.

Climate
Sidney enjoys a cool Mediterranean climate (Csb) with year-round mild temperatures and moderate rainfall. Most years see very little snow. Daily temperatures seldom climb above , or dip below . In the mildest winters, minimum temperatures stay above . Damaging winds are less frequent than in most other maritime areas of Canada.

Fauna
The environs of Sidney provides habitat for a diverse array of fish and wildlife, both terrestrial and marine, coming and going with the seasons. For this reason it is a growing mecca for bird watchers, whale watchers, scuba-divers and eco-tourism. Sidney's most famous inhabitant is the bufflehead featured prominently on its coat of arms. The bufflehead is just one of many species of waterfowl that overwinter in Shoal Harbour Migratory Bird Sanctuary, one of the oldest marine sanctuaries on the west coast. Sidney overlooks Sidney Channel Important Bird Area, an internationally recognized site of major importance for many species of seabirds such as common murres, rhinoceros auklet, pigeon guillemots, murrelets, three species of cormorants, and several gull species, including the unusual Heermann's gull. Another resident bird is the bald eagle which has nested continuously in 'Beaufort Grove' for twenty-five years. In summer large numbers of great blue herons gather in Roberts Bay (part of Shoal Harbour Sanctuary) to feed on the abundant small fish. A variety of songbirds (towhees, American robins, Bewick's and winter wrens, bushtits, chickadees etc.) are found in back yards, along with the common northwestern crow, and introduced species such as the common starling and house sparrow. The airport lands around Sidney are the only place in North America where the song of the European skylark can be heard.

Marine mammals include the ubiquitous harbour seal and the small harbour porpoise. Occasionally gray whales and killer whales can be seen from Sidney's waterfront. Marine-adapted river otters are common coastal inhabitants, along with raccoon, and mink. Adjacent woodlands and farmlands are home to the small, shy black-tailed deer. In recent years, the introduced, invasive eastern grey squirrel has become abundant.

The waters around Sidney once supported a large sports fishery, based largely on Chinook salmon, along with ground fish such as ling cod, and various rockfish (Sebastes), but overfishing and poor management have greatly reduced the sports fishery. Also, ecological change and the decline of critical forage species such as the Pacific herring and the sand lance have had significant impacts on the larger predators, including salmon, killer whales and seabirds. Many of the common fish species and other marine fauna can be seen at the Shaw Ocean Discovery Centre on the Sidney waterfront.

Flora
Sidney is situated within the coastal Douglas fir ecosystem, one of the most restricted ecosystems in Canada, dominated by large Douglas firs, along with its most distinctive species, the Arbutus and Garry oak in drier exposures, and the aptly named big leaf maple, and western red cedar in damper sites. Deciduous trees include the black cottonwood, Douglas maple, red alder, Pacific dogwood, bitter cherry, Pacific crab apple, cascara, quaking aspen, hawthorn and several species of willow. Coastal areas contain several unique plant communities including sea asparagus, salt grass and eelgrass, documented by the renowned botanist and explorer, John Macoun, after he retired as curator of the National Museum in 1912.

Many non-native plants also occur, including many invasive species such as English ivy, Scotch broom, laurel-leafed daphne, Himalayan blackberry, chicory, Queen Anne's lace, and red clover. Long-established exotic trees include London plane, horsechestnut, flowering cherry, flowering plum, Norway maple, sycamore maple, Japanese maple, catalpa and tulip tree. In recent years the American sweetgum, Freeman maple and Chinese windmill palm have become popular.

Notes

References

External links

Populated places in the Capital Regional District
Towns in British Columbia
Populated places on the British Columbia Coast
Saanich Peninsula